Sarah Gancher is an American playwright.

She has worked with ensembles including the Telluride Theatre in Telluride, Colorado, The Team in New York City, and the Blue Man Group.  In addition, she has assisted on the television show The Colbert Report, and worked with the theater organizations The Big Apple Circus, and Stellapolaris in Norway. She is also a jazz violinist.

Plays (full length) 

 I'll Get You Back Again
 Duet
 The Place We Built
 Klauzál Square
 Seder
 Lovebird With a Mirror

Plays (short) 

 Settlers of Catan
 Budapest December 2011
 1978 Verbatim
 Five Mothers
 The Great Sacrifice
 In This Place
 Anniversary

References

Living people
American women dramatists and playwrights
Year of birth missing (living people)
21st-century American dramatists and playwrights
21st-century American women writers